The Seram long-tailed mosaic-tailed rat (Melomys fulgens), also known as the Seram long-tailed melomys, is a species of rodent in the family Muridae.
It is found only on the south coast of the island of Seram in Indonesia. At one time it was thought to be a subspecies of the white-bellied mosaic-tailed rat (Melomys leucogaster) but was subsequently raised to full species level. It differs from that species in having a much longer, scale-free tail with a calloused tip which is likely to be prehensile and used while climbing trees.

The IUCN has insufficient information on which to assess its conservation status so it is listed as "data deficient".

References

Melomys
Mammals of Indonesia
Mammals described in 1920
Taxa named by Oldfield Thomas